Wiktor Eckhaus (28 June 1930 – 1 October 2000) was a Polish–Dutch mathematician, known for his work on the field of differential equations. He was Professor Emeritus of Applied Mathematics at the Utrecht University.

Biography
Eckhaus was born into a wealthy family, and raised in Warsaw where his father was managing a fur company. During the German occupation of Poland, he, his mother and sister had to hide because of their Jewish descent. His father, after being a prisoner of war, joined the Russian Army. After the war, in 1947, the re-united family came to Amsterdam – via a refugee camp in Austria.

Wiktor passed the state exam of the Hogere Burgerschool in 1948, and started to study aeronautics at the Delft University of Technology. Following his graduation he worked with the National Aerospace Laboratory in Amsterdam, from 1953 till 1957. In the period 1957–1960 he worked at the Massachusetts Institute of Technology, where Eckhaus earned a PhD in 1959 under Leon Trilling on a dissertation entitled "Some problems of unsteady flow with discontinuities".

In 1960, he became a "maître de recherches" (senior research fellow) at the Department of Mechanics of the Sorbonne. In 1964 he was a visiting professor at the University of Amsterdam and the Mathematical Centre. Thereafter, in 1965, he became professor at the Delft University of Technology, in pure and applied mathematics and mechanics. From 1972 until his retirement in 1994, Eckhaus was professor of applied mathematics at the Utrecht University.

Initially he studied the flow around airfoils, leading to his research on the stability of solutions to (weakly nonlinear) differential equations. This resulted in what is now known as the Eckhaus instability criterion and Eckhaus instability, appearing for instance as a secondary instability in models of Rayleigh–Bénard convection. Later, Eckhaus worked on singular perturbation theory and soliton equations.

In 1983 he treated strongly singular relaxation oscillations – called "canards" (French for "ducks") – resulting in his most-read paper "Relaxation oscillations including a standard chase on French ducks". Eckhaus used standard methods of analysis, on a problem qualified before, by Marc Diener, as an example of a problem only treatable through the use of non-standard analysis.

He became a member of the Royal Netherlands Academy of Arts and Sciences in 1987.

Publications

Notes

References

  Also appeared as:

External links
 

1930 births
2000 deaths
People from Ivano-Frankivsk
People from Stanisławów Voivodeship
Ukrainian Jews
Polish emigrants to the Netherlands
Dutch people of Ukrainian-Jewish descent
Aerodynamicists
20th-century Dutch mathematicians
MIT School of Engineering alumni
Academic staff of Utrecht University
Academic staff of the Delft University of Technology
Members of the Royal Netherlands Academy of Arts and Sciences